Thiacidas alboporphyrea  is a moth of the family Noctuidae. It is found in Madagascar and the adults have a wingspan of 50 mm.

See also
 List of moths of Madagascar

References

Thiacidas
Moths of Madagascar
Moths of Africa
Moths described in 1907